Smile is a 2009 English language Italian horror/thriller film starring Armand Assante. It is the debut feature by Francesco Gasperoni.

A sequel was planned for release in late 2020 tentatively titled Smile II: Tollinger in the Mood.

Plot
A group of college friends go on holiday to Morocco, and when one of them loses her camera she buys an instant camera from a mysterious man at a curio shop. However, the camera seems to be cursed, as everyone whose picture is taken with it ends up dying under mysterious circumstances. The remaining members must race to decipher the supernatural clues in the photos to save themselves.

Cast

References

English-language Italian films
2009 films
2009 horror films
2000s English-language films
2000s Italian films